Chordifex laxus  is a rush species of the genus Chordifex in the family Restionaceae. It is endemic to the south-west of Western Australia.

It was first described by Robert Brown in 1810 as Restio laxus, but was transferred to the genus, Chordifex by Lawrie Johnson and Barbara Briggs in 1998.

References

External links 

 Chordifex laxus occurrence data from the Australasian Virtual Herbarium

Restionaceae

Taxa named by Robert Brown (botanist, born 1773)